The first Regional Elections of Nord-Pas-de-Calais-Picardie were held on 6 and 13 December 2015.  At stake were the Regional Council of Nord-Pas-de-Calais-Picardie.

These elections were the first to be held for the redrawn regions- the 27 regions of France were amalgamated into 18, this went into effect on 1 January 2016. The former regions of Nord-Pas-de-Calais and Picardy were merged and became the region of Nord-Pas-de-Calais-Picardie, later named Hauts-de-France.

Voting system

The regional elections are held in direct universal suffrage using proportional representation lists. The election is held over two rounds, with majority bonus. The lists must be gender balanced by alternatively have a male candidate and a female candidate from the top to the bottom of the list. Only lists with as many candidates as available seats in every departement of the region may compete.

Following the 1999 and 2003 electoral reforms, with a first implementation in 2004, a two-round runoff voting system is used to elect the regional presidents. If no party gets at least 50% of the vote in the first round, a second round is held, which any party who got at least 10% in the first round may enter. Lists that obtain at least 5% of the vote in the first round may merge in the second round with a 'qualified list', which includes candidates from each merged list.

At the decisive round (first round if a list won 50%, the second round if not), the leading list receives a premium of 25% of the seats while the remaining seats are distributed among all lists who received at least 5% of votes. Thus, the majority bonus allows a leading list to have an absolute majority of seats in the Regional Council from one third of votes in the second round. The seats are distributed among the lists at the regional level but within each list, seats are allocated by departement branch in proportion to the number of votes in each department.

In the regional council there are 170 members, and they are elected in the 5 departments(17 members for Aisne, 25 for Oise, 18 for the Somme, 76 for the Nord and 44 for Pas-de-Calais

Opinion polls

Results
France uses a two-round runoff system to elect the regional presidencies, and as such not all seats contested will see a candidate elected in the first round.

First round
The first round election was held on 6 December 2015.

Second round
Runoff elections were held on 13 December 2015 in regions where no candidate was able to win outright in the first round.

After the first round, the Front National achieve nearly 41% of the votes and the Socialist candidate decided to withdraw his list  from competing in the second round, in an attempt to block Marine Le Pen and the Front National from becoming the majority party in the second round due to split opposition from the centre-left and centre-right blocs.

The result was a disappointment for the Front National, which was unable to win any of the regional presidencies, including Nord-Pas-de-Calais-Picardie, in the face of concerted tactical voting. However, they managed to increase their share of the vote from the first round. Of the 12 regions in mainland France, 7 were won by the Republicans and 5 were retained by the Socialists.

Distribution by departments

References

External links 
 Results

Content in this edit is translated from the existing French Wikipedia article at :fr:Élections régionales de 2015 en Nord-Pas-de-Calais-Picardie; see its history for attribution.

Nord-Pas-de-Calais, 2015
2015 elections in France
Hauts-de-France